A Legendary Christmas with John and Chrissy is an American Christmas special variety show starring John Legend and Chrissy Teigen. The special premiered on November 28, 2018 on NBC.

Synopsis
A Legendary Christmas with John and Chrissy presents John Legend and Chrissy Teigen joined by friends and family who stop by their home to celebrate the holidays. The special features Legend and Teigen doing festive activities like surprise caroling with friends and family, and also features Legend perform songs from his Christmas album, A Legendary Christmas.

Cast

Main
 John Legend
 Chrissy Teigen
 The Legends (Legend's family)
 The Teigens (Teigen's family)
 Raphael Saadiq and the House Band

Guests
 Awkwafina
 Neal Brennan
 Darren Criss
 Zach Galifianakis
 Derek Hough
 Kris Jenner
 Kim Kardashian West
 Yassir Lester
 Jane Lynch
 Retta
 Sam Richardson
 Ben Schwartz
 Tien Tran
 Meghan Trainor
 Stevie Wonder

Cameos
 Kenan Thompson
 The Voice Coaches – Kelly Clarkson, Adam Levine and Blake Shelton
 Queer Eye's The Fab Five – Antoni Porowski, Tan France, Karamo Brown, Bobby Berk and Jonathan Van Ness

References

External links

A Legendary Christmas with John and Chrissy on NBC

2018 television specials
Christmas television specials
John Legend